Kimmo Koskenkorva (born 21 June 1978) is a Finnish former professional ice hockey player who played for Kärpät team in the Finnish Liiga. His last team was second tier Peliitat for season 2013-14.

Career statistics

External links

References 

1978 births
People from Haukipudas
Finnish ice hockey forwards
Oulun Kärpät players
Tappara players
SaiPa players
Skellefteå AIK players
Living people
Sportspeople from North Ostrobothnia